Raymond Elwood Fancher (born 1940) is an American psychologist and historian. He is a Senior Scholar and Professor Emeritus at York University in Toronto, where he also helped to found the History and Theory of Psychology Ph.D. program. He is the author of nearly 100 publications on the history of psychology, and served as editor-in-chief of the Journal of the History of the Behavioral Sciences from 2001 to 2005.

References

Living people
21st-century American psychologists
21st-century American historians
20th-century American historians
People from Waterbury, Connecticut
Wesleyan University alumni
Harvard University alumni
Academic staff of York University
Historians of psychology
Psychology journal editors
1940 births
20th-century American psychologists